The Department of Trade was an Australian government department that existed between January 1956 and December 1963.

Scope
Information about the department's functions and/or government funding allocation could be found in the Administrative Arrangements Orders, the annual Portfolio Budget Statements and in the department's annual reports.

At the department's creation it was responsible for:
trade promotion and trade policy, including the Trade Commissioner Service, the trade publicity branch and published Overseas Trading
trade treaties and arrangements 
trade investigations
tariff policy
Tariff Board
trade agreements
import licensing policy
industrial development

Structure
The department was a Commonwealth Public Service department, staffed by officials who were responsible to the Minister for Trade, John McEwen.

References

Trade
Ministries established in 1956